Sir John Rous, 2nd Baronet (c.1656 – 8 April 1730) of Henham, Suffolk, was an English Tory politician.

Rous was the son of Sir John Rous, 1st Baronet and his second wife, Elizabeth Knyvett. He was educated at St Catharine's College, Cambridge. He was an opponent of the Conventicle Act 1664. In 1670 he succeeded to his father's baronetcy. Rous was appointed a Deputy Lieutenant of Suffolk in 1676, High Sheriff of Suffolk in 1678 and in 1680 he was the colonel of the county militia troop of horse. Between 1680 and 1688 he was a justice of the peace for Suffolk.

In 1685, Rous was elected as a Tory Member of Parliament for Eye. He was removed from the lieutenancy and peace commission of Suffolk in 1688 for opposing James II of England's religious policies. Despite this, he voted that James had not vacated the throne during the Glorious Revolution. In 1689 he was returned as a member for Suffolk and reappointed as a justice of the peace, but he was not re-elected at the 1690 election. Rous was suspected of being a Jacobite and was removed as a magistrate in 1694. In 1721, Rous' name was sent to James Francis Edward Stuart as being a likely supporter of the Jacobite cause. He died in 1730.

References

Year of birth uncertain
1730 deaths
Alumni of St Catharine's College, Cambridge
Baronets in the Baronetage of England
Deputy Lieutenants of Suffolk
English Jacobites
English justices of the peace
English MPs 1685–1687
English MPs 1689–1690
Protestant Jacobites
Tory MPs (pre-1834)